Garak-dong is a neighbourhood, dong of Songpa-gu, Seoul, South Korea. The exact etymology is unknown but said that the town was once called garakgol (가락골).

Education
Schools located in Garak-dong:
 Seoul Gadong Elementary School
 Seoul Garak Elementary School
 Seoul Sinka Elementary School
 Gawon Middle School
 Seokchon Middle School
 Songpa Middle School

Transportation 
 Ogeum station of 

See also
Administrative divisions of South Korea

References

External links
 Garak-dong resident center website

Neighbourhoods of Songpa District